"Falling Off the Edge of the World" is a 1967 song and single by Australian rock group The Easybeats, which was written by band members George Young and Harry Vanda.

Background and releases
The song was recorded in New York, during the group's first U.S. tour  The single was released as a single in the U.S., Germany and the Netherlands in September 1967.  In other countries, it was a B-side.  Various versions of the song have been released.  In the U.K. a faster version that was arranged by composer Bill Shepherd was released as the B-side to the "Hello, How Are You" single.

It has been often reported that musician Lou Reed was a fan of the song and played the single frequently on the Max's Kansas City jukebox.  He was quoted as saying it was "one of the most beautiful records ever made".

Track listing
U.S. - United Artists UA 50206 released: 5 September 1967
"Falling Off the Edge of the World (Seeing You With Him)" ( Harry Vanda, George Young) – 2:35
"Remember Sam" (Harry Vanda, George Young) – 2:28

Charts

References

1967 singles
The Easybeats songs
Number-one singles in Australia
Parlophone singles
Songs written by George Young (rock musician)
1967 songs
Songs written by Harry Vanda